Loch Lomond Golf Club is located in Luss, Argyll & Bute, Scotland on the shore of Loch Lomond.  The course occupies land previously held by Clan Colquhoun and includes the clan's seat of Rossdhu House as its clubhouse.

History
While Clan Colquhoun had occupied the site of the present club since ancient times, the medieval Rossdhu Castle was constructed by Sir John Colquhoun in 1457 along with the private chapel of St. Mary of Rossdhu when his lands were consolidated into the free Barony of Luss. Rossdhu is derived from the Scottish Gaelic , meaning the "black headland".

Mary, Queen of Scots visited in 1563 and her household ate a fish supper on 17 July including salmon, ling, and trout cooked in butter. The castle was ruined in a fire after the construction of Rossdhu Mansion (ruins can be seen directly behind the course's 18th green).

The central portion of the present house, known as Rossdhu Mansion, was completed in 1773. The grand Georgian manor house was constructed by Sir James Colquhoun and was likely designed by well-known architect John Baxter to replace the 15th-century castle, though no documentation survives. This was the family seat when Sir James Colquhoun, 3rd Baronet led the clan and the writer Janet Colquhoun was his wife.

Until the late 1970s, the house was home to Sir Ivar Colquhoun, 8th Baronet, and Lady Colquhoun. They loaned many original pieces of furniture and artwork to the restored manor house in 1994, thus assuring that Rossdhu Mansion would be historically preserved notwithstanding ownership by the club.

Accommodations

The club also has a total of 43 suites, located at the Carriage House, Garden Cottages, The Point, and the Loch Shore Lodges for members and their guests staying overnight. This provides increased revenue for the club, as it can stay open throughout the year as a luxury hotel and accommodate visitors for long stays despite the countryside location.  Amenities for members and their guests include a pro shop, locker rooms, an on-site health club built inside a historical walled garden which opened in September 2006, two formal dining rooms, and a casual bar and grill.  Additional outdoor activities include boat tours of Loch Lomond, fitness programs, hiking, bicycle riding, clay shooting, and game hunting.

Golf course
Designed by Tom Weiskopf and Jay Morrish, the  course is considered to be among the 100 finest golf courses in the world. In 2005 it was ranked 66th (ranked by Golf Magazine). Opened  in 1993, the course makes heavy use of natural hazards such as streams and marshland areas.

Loch Lomond hosted the Scottish Open on the European Tour for ten seasons (from 2001 through 2010; succeeded by Castle Stuart), and European Tour events in each of the previous five seasons.

Scorecard

References

External links
Official site

Golf clubs and courses in Argyll and Bute
Solheim Cup venues
Sports venues completed in 1993
1993 establishments in Scotland
Loch Lomond